Carl Engström may refer to:

 Carl Engström (basketball) (born 1991), Swedish basketball player
 Carl Gunnar Engström (1912–1987), Swedish physician and innovator
 Carl Adolf Engström (1855–1924), Finnish engineer, businessman and vuorineuvos
 Carl David Engström (born 1990), Swedish footballer